Below is a list of heads of state of Ireland.

Kings of Ireland (1542–1922) 
The title "King of Ireland" was created by an act of the Irish Parliament in 1541, replacing the Lordship of Ireland, which had existed since 1171, with the Kingdom of Ireland.

British monarchs: 

 Henry VIII (1542–47); Lord of Ireland 1509–42; made king by the Crown of Ireland Act 1542
 Edward VI (1547–53)
 Lady Jane Grey (1553; disputed)
 Mary I (1553–58)
 Philip jure uxoris (1554–58); his role as King of Ireland was reinforced by the Treason Act 1554
 Elizabeth I (1558–1603)
 James I (1603–25)
 Charles I (1625–49)

The Wars of the Three Kingdoms (incorporating the Irish Rebellion of 1641, Confederate Ireland, the Cromwellian conquest of Ireland and the Irish Confederate Wars) took place between 1639 and 1651. Charles I was executed in 1649 and his son Charles II was recognised by some Irish lords as King of Ireland. The Interregnum began with England, Ireland, Scotland and Wales ruled by the Council of State, then the Lord Protector Oliver Cromwell (1649–58) and his son Richard Cromwell (1658–59). The Restoration in Ireland was effected in 1660 without major opposition, Charles II being declared king on 14 May 1660 by the Irish Convention.

 Charles II (1660–85)
 James II (1685–89)
 William III (1689–1702) & Mary II (1689–94)

The position of King of Ireland was contested by William III and James II between 1689 and 1691, after the Glorious Revolution of 1688. The Crown and Parliament Recognition Act 1689 made William King of Ireland, and this was reinforced by his victory at the Battle of the Boyne (part of the Williamite War in Ireland).

 Anne (1702–14)
 The Acts of Union 1707 united the Kingdom of England and Kingdom of Scotland to form the Kingdom of Great Britain. However, the Kingdom of Ireland remained a separate state.
 George I (1714–27)
 George II (1727–60)
 George III (1760–1800)

The Acts of Union 1800, instituted in reaction to the Irish Rebellion of 1798, created the United Kingdom of Great Britain and Ireland.
 George III (1801–1820)
 George IV (1820–1830)
 William IV (1830–1837)
 Victoria (1837–1901) 
 Edward VII (1901–1910)
 George V (1910–1922)

Irish Republic (1919–1922)

List of office-holders 
Cathal Brugha (21 January 1919 – 1 April 1919)
Éamon de Valera (1 April 1919 – 9 January 1922)
Arthur Griffith (10 January 1922 – 12 August 1922)
Michael Collins (16 January 1922 – 22 August 1922)
W. T. Cosgrave (22 August 1922 – 6 December 1922)

Kings of the Irish Free State and Ireland (1922–1936)

 George V (1922–1936) (The Irish Free State became a self-governing Dominion of the British Empire and subsequently, in 1931, a legislatively independent country.)
 Edward VIII (1936)
 Arguably George VI (1936–1949), for external purposes only, whose status was diminished (see Irish head of state from 1922 to 1949).

Following the Ireland Act 1949, only that part of Ireland known as Northern Ireland remained part of a monarchy.

Governors-General of the Irish Free State 
The governor-general was appointed by the King on the advice of his Irish ministers. Initially, the British government had some involvement in the appointment process. However, this ended following the 1926 Imperial Conference; thenceforth, only the government of the Irish Free State was formally involved. A further effect of the 1926 conference (in particular, of the Balfour Declaration) was that the monarch also ceased to receive formal advice from the British government in relation to his role in the Irish Free State; such advice thenceforth came officially only from the Executive Council of the Irish Free State (the Cabinet).

Presidents of Ireland (1938–present)
The office of president was established in 1937, in part as a replacement for the office of governor-general that existed during the 1922–37 Irish Free State. The seven-year term of office of the president was inspired by that of the presidents of Weimar Germany. At the time the office was established critics warned that the post might lead to the emergence of a dictatorship. However, these fears were not borne out as successive presidents played a limited, largely apolitical role in national affairs.

The functions of the president were exercised by the Presidential Commission from the coming into force of the Constitution on 29 December 1937 until the coming into office of Douglas Hyde in 1938, and during the vacancies of 1974, 1976, and 1997.

See also
 Great Seal of the Irish Free State
 History of the Republic of Ireland
 Irish head of state from 1922 to 1949
 Governor of Northern Ireland
 President of the Irish Republic
 Seal of the President of Ireland
 Secretary-General to the President (Ireland)

References

Sources

Further reading
 
 based on

External links

Politics of the Republic of Ireland
1938 establishments in Ireland